Sgùrr Breac is a mountain with a height of  in Wester Ross in the Northwest Highlands of Scotland. A remote mountain, Sgùrr Breac is part of the Fannichs range, and has a very steep north face. It is usually climbed from its eastern side. The nearest settlement is Auchindrean.

References

Mountains and hills of the Northwest Highlands
Marilyns of Scotland
Munros